Bembidarenini is a tribe of ground beetles in the family Carabidae. There are 4 genera and more than 30 described species in Bembidarenini. Three of the genera are found in South America and one in Australia.

Genera
These four genera belong to the tribe Bembidarenini:
 Andinodontis Erwin & Toledano, 2010  (South America)
 Argentinatachoides Sallanave; Erwin & Roig-Juñent, 2008  (Argentina)
 Bembidarenas Erwin, 1972  (Chile, Argentina)
 Tasmanitachoides Erwin, 1972  (Australia)

References

Trechinae
Beetle tribes